The 1984 Nebraska Cornhuskers football team represented the University of Nebraska–Lincoln in the 1984 NCAA Division I-A football season. The team was coached by Tom Osborne and played their home games in Memorial Stadium in Lincoln, Nebraska.

Schedule

Roster

Depth chart

Coaching staff

Game summaries

Wyoming

Nebraska was forced to put extra effort in for the win after losing three of four first-half fumbles and giving up an interception, as Wyoming won the turnover battle 4–1.

Minnesota

'Fumble-itis' continued to plague Nebraska, after the ball was put on the ground eight times, half of them lost to Minnesota.  Still, the newly minted #1 Cornhuskers easily put away the turnover-free Golden Gophers with the help of 405 yards on the ground.

UCLA

Nebraska dominated UCLA in the new Rose Bowl home of the Bruins, handing them their worst loss in 14 years.  The Cornhuskers recorded eight sacks while running up 42 points, while the offensive output of the Bruins netted only a 3rd quarter field goal.

Syracuse

Unranked Syracuse, coming off a 0–19 shutout loss against Rutgers at home the week prior, severely embarrassed the #1 Cornhuskers, who may have been guilty of overlooking the team they had defeated 63-7 the year before.  Nebraska's regular season winning streak was ended at 23.  Coach Osborne stated it simply; "They were more physical today".

Oklahoma State

It was another season of disappointment for Oklahoma State's record against Nebraska.  The Cowboys came to Lincoln with a better record than the Cornhuskers for the first time ever, with high hopes after Nebraska fell to Syracuse the week before, and OSU indeed led the game for three quarters.  A 4th quarter, 49 yard punt return by Shane Swanson swung the momentum to Nebraska, and Oklahoma State's 22-year-long drought against Nebraska was extended yet another year.

Missouri

Missouri fought a hard battle and barely won the time of possession battle, at one point drawing within 6 points, but a 57-yard interception return for a touchdown opened the game up a bit as Nebraska gained enough room to finish the game ahead by 10.

Colorado

The Blackshirts carried Nebraska for three quarters as the offense sputtered and failed to produce a useful lead.  Finally, in the 4th quarter, the Cornhuskers overcame their struggles and ran off 21 points for the win.

Kansas State

Nebraska recorded its 25th straight conference win as Kansas State rolled over and fell behind by 48–7 at the half.  The lead allowed the Cornhuskers to rotate several players into the game, which resulted in no single player exceeding 100 rushing yards rushing for the first time in 20 games.

Iowa State

Nebraska held Iowa State's star receiver to two catches for 11 yards, and the Cyclones offense to just five first downs, as the Blackshirts posted their first shutout in two years.  By the 4th quarter, Iowa State's own defense lost their effectiveness and could no longer keep up, as the Cornhuskers rolled up 28 more points to pull away.

Kansas

The Cornhuskers held Kansas to just 12 first downs and 24 yards on the ground, clinching at least a share of the 1984 Big 8 Title.

Oklahoma

Four painful turnovers were enough to overcome the statistical success Nebraska achieved, as Oklahoma ended Nebraska's 27 game conference win streak and 21 game win streak in Lincoln.  The run-oriented Cornhuskers out-passed the Sooners 236–58, but two key stops by the Sooners in the 2nd half put down Nebraska's hopes for a shot the National Championship.

LSU

Nebraska overcame a 10-point deficit to come within 3 by halftime, and after that it was all Nebraska as the Cornhuskers won the turnover game's battle 6-3 and ran off 21 more points while shutting down all further attempts by LSU to score.

Rankings

Awards

NFL and pro players
The following Nebraska players who participated in the 1984 season later moved on to the next level and joined a professional or semi-pro team as draftees or free agents.

References

Nebraska
Nebraska Cornhuskers football seasons
Big Eight Conference football champion seasons
Sugar Bowl champion seasons
Nebraska Cornhuskers football